

Ristna Lighthouse (Estonian: Ristna tuletorn) is a lighthouse located in Ristna Point, Kõpu Peninsula, on the island of Hiiumaa (on the coast of the Baltic Sea) in Estonia.

History 

The lighthouse was built in 1874, as a result of constant fogs, which made the old Kõpu lighthouse nearly invisible. The main reason for the decision to build the lighthouse was to warn sailors of drifting sea ice; which caused a major obstacle in the Gulf of Finland. The current iron metal structure of the lighthouse was built in 1874.  The lighthouse survived World War I with small amounts of damage; however, to improve the lighthouse's stability, the structure was cast in concrete in 1920.

See also 

 List of lighthouses in Estonia

References

External links 

 

Lighthouses completed in 1874
Resort architecture in Estonia
Lighthouses in Estonia
Hiiumaa Parish
Buildings and structures in Hiiu County
Tourist attractions in Hiiu County